Carl Brinkmann (19 March 1885 – 20 May 1954) was a German sociologist and economist, focusing on socioeconomics and the history of political economy.

Brinkmann was born in Tilsit, East Prussia, now in Kaliningrad, and died in Oberstdorf, Allgäu. In 1904 he was awarded a Rhodes Scholarship to study at The Queen's College, Oxford.  He taught as a professor at the Heidelberg University (1923), Berlin University (1942), and Tübingen University (1946).

Literary works 
 Weltpolitik und Weltwirtschaft im 19. Jahrhundert, 1921
 Englische Geschichte, 1815–1914, 21936
 Wirtschaftsformen und Lebensformen, 1944
 Soziologische Theorie der Revolution, 1948
 Wirtschaftstheorie, 1948

External links 
 Biography (Archived 2009-10-31)

1885 births
1954 deaths
German Rhodes Scholars
German sociologists
Economic historians
People from East Prussia
People from Tilsit
Heidelberg University alumni
20th-century German  economists
German male non-fiction writers
20th-century German historians